Liberty is an unincorporated community in Bear Lake County, Idaho.

History
It was first settled by Mormon settlers under the overall leadership of Charles C. Rich in 1864.

Liberty's population was 80 in 1909, and was 60 in 1960.

References

Unincorporated communities in Idaho
Unincorporated communities in Bear Lake County, Idaho
Populated places established in 1864